Haji Arafat Shaikh is an Indian politician. He is a member of the Bharatiya Janata Party (BJP). He serves as President of the Maharashtra State Minority Commission (Cabinet minister Status) and the President of the Maharashtra State Muslim Samaj Unit.

Early life 
He was born in Mumbai,Kurla in the Indian state of Maharashtra.

Career 
Haji Arfat Shaikh started his political career working with Bhartiya Vidhyarthi Sena, the student wing of Shiv Sena. He later joined the Maharashtra Navnirman Sena where became the party's vice-president and chief of the transport wing. Shaikh rejoined Shiv Sena in 2014 and became Shiv Sena's deputy leader and president of Maharashtra Shiv Vahatuk Sena, the party's transport wing. 

He then joined BJP in September 2018, assuming the role of Chairman of the Maharashtra Minority Commission.

Positions held 

 Ex.Chairman – Maharashtra State Minority Commission (Cabinet Minister Status)
 President – Maharashtra State Muslim Khatik Samaj Unit

References 

21st-century Indian politicians
1977 births
Living people